Repince is a village in the municipality of Vladičin Han, Serbia. According to the 2002 census, the village has a population of 972 people.

References

Populated places in Pčinja District